Flowers of the Prison is a 2016 South Korean drama television series starring Jin Se-yeon, Go Soo, Kim Mi-sook, Jung Joon-ho, Park Joo-mi, Yoon Joo-hee, Jun Kwang-ryul and Choi Tae-joon. It is MBC's special project drama to commemorate the network's 55th-founding anniversary. The drama also marks the 3rd time collaboration between director Lee Byung-hoon and writer Choi Wan-kyu, after Hur Jun and Sangdo. It replaced Marriage Contract and aired on MBC every Saturdays and Sundays at 22:00 (KST) for 51 episodes from April 30 to November 6, 2016.

Plot

Set during the Joseon dynasty, the series details the story of Ok-nyeo (Jin Se-yeon), a girl who was born and raised in prison, and her adventures with the mysterious Yun Tae-won (Go Soo). She later becomes an advocate for the poor and unfairly accused through the Waeji-bu, the private litigation system in Joseon.

Cast

Main cast
 Jin Se-yeon as Ok-nyeo/Lee Seo-won
 Jung Da-bin as young Ok-nyeo
 Go Soo as Yun Tae-won
 Jung Yoon-seok as young Yun Tae-won
 Kim Mi-sook as Queen Munjeong
 Jung Joon-ho as Yun Won-hyeong
 Park Joo-mi as Jeong Nan-jeong
 Yoon Joo-hee as Yi So-jeong
  as Yun Shin-hye
 Roh Jeong-eui as young Yun Shin-hye
 Jun Kwang-ryul as Park Tae-su
 Choi Tae-joon as Seong Ji-heon, Podocheong's Captain (포도종사관) ; then key person at Ministry of Personnel 이조장랑.

People of Jeonokseo
Jeonokseo (전옥서, 典獄暑): Royal Prison

 Jung Eun-pyo as Ji Cheon-deuk, Jeonokseo's scribe (서리), Ok-nyeo's adoptive father
 Kim Eung-soo, special appearance, as Jeonokseo's Director E01
 Choi Min-chul as Jeong Dae-sik (Jeonokseo's Director, 전옥서 주부, rank 6)
  as Lee Hyo-sung (Jeonokseo's curator, 봉사 rk8)
  as Yoo Jong-hoe (Jeonokseo's assistant curator, 참봉 rk9)
 Ahn Yeo-jin as Yu-geum, kitchen damo
  as Deok-boon, jail damo
  as Jae-deok (Jeonokseo's jailer)
 Shorry J as Cheon-doong, pickpocket.
  as Jeon Woo-chi
 Joo Jin-mo as Tojeong Yi Ji-ham, philosophy and strategy teacher of Ok-nyeo.
  as Go Dae-gil

Mapo-Songpa merchants
  as Gong Jae-myung
  as Do-chi
  as Jak-doo
  as Seong Hwan-ok

People around Jeong Nan-jeong and Yun Won-hyung
 Yoon Yoo-sun, special appearance, as Lady Kim, Yun Won-hyeong's legal wife (김씨 부인, 정실). Exiled at Anggukdong 앙국동, then poisoned.
 Maeng Sang-hoon as Jeong Mak-gae, brother of Jeong Nan-jeong.
  as Min Dong-joo, head merchant, wife of Jeong Mak-gae.
  as Oh Jong-geum, lady in waiting then 'Second Madam' of Yun Won-hyeong
  as Cheon Sun-geum, 
  as Dong Chang, henchman of Jeong Nan-jeong.
  as Jeong Man-ho (Jeong Nan-jeong's younger cousin)

People of gisaeng house Sosoru
 Oh Na-ra as Hwang Gyo-ha, Head Gisaeng
  as Seong Cha-heum, administrator
 Yoon Joo-hee as Yi So-jeong, main cast, 2nd Head Gisaeng, from Songdo
 Lee Ji-seon as Chae-seon
  as Da-jeong
 Kim Ji-eun as Myo-hyang
 Son Na-rae as Shin-bi
 , cameo, as Tae-won's mother ***

People in the Palace
 Seo Ha-joon as King Myeongjong
 Lee Seung-ah as Court Lady Han (상궁, Myeongjong's palace), former friend of late Ga-bi.
 Ryu Seung-gook as Han Jae-seo (Naegeumwi's Captain, 내금위 종사관, Myeongjong's palace)
  as Chief Eunuch (Myeongjong's palace)
 Kim Mi-sook as Queen Munjeong, main cast
  as Gi Chun-su (Naegeumwi's Captain, 내금위 종사관, Queen Dowager's palace)
 Kim Min-kyung as Court Lady Kim, (상궁, Queen Dowager's palace)
  as King Jungjong (Ok-nyeo's biological father)
 Bae Geu-rin as Ga-bi (Ok-nyeo's mother)
  as Lee Myung-heon (former Naegeumwi's Captain, Jungjong's reign)
  as Prince Haseong (later King Seonjo, third son of Prince Deokheung)

Naegeumwi (내금위, 內禁衛): the Palace Guards

Special Service (chetamin, 체탐인)
 Jun Kwang-ryul, special appearance, as Park Tae-su, former head of chetamin, then teacher of Chinese and martial arts of Ok-nyeo.
 Im Ho as Gang Seon-ho, current head of chetamin. Undercover as Podocheong's lieutnant, then secretary of the War Minister (Daeyun).
  as Ju Cheol-gi, instructor. Kills Park Tae-su by order of Yun Won-hyeong. Soyun faction.
  as Yun Tae-gyu
  as Min Su-ok, former Court Lady (Jungjong's reign)   
 Go Eun-soo as Cho-hee, Ok-nyeo's escort warrior

People of Podocheong
Podocheong (포도청,  捕盜廳): Agency to Arrest the Thieves 
  as Podocheong's Chief (포도대장)
 Choi Tae-joon as Seong Ji-heon, main cast, Podocheong's Captain (포도종사관) until E22 
  as Podocheong's Captain (포도종사관) until E37
  as Podocheong's Captain (포도종사관) from E44
  as Yang Dong-gu (lieutenant, 포도부장)
  as Song Seok-wu (lieutenant, 포도부장)

People of Pyeongsiseo
Pyeongsiseo (평시서, 平市署): Marketing Control Office

  as Yi Young-shin, Pyeongsiseo's Superintendent 평시서 제조. Yeonggam ranked. E18, E36sqq 
  as Pyeongsiseo's Superintendent (interim E23) 
 Go Soo, as Yun Tae-won, main cast, Pyeongsiseo's Administrator 평시서 주부, rank 6a (E23-E40). 
  as Oh Dal-joong, former Pyeongsiseo's Administrator 평시서 주부 
 Yi Jae-jun (이재준) as 	Jo Se-Oh, Pyeongsiseo's assistant 
 Gang Jun-yeong (강준영) as Hwang Myeong-geol Pyeongsiseo's assistant

Extended cast
  as Lee Jeong-myung, Minister of War
 Kim Jin-ho as Jung Sang-ho, Ministry of Rites, then Minister of Taxation

Hyeongjo (형조, 刑曹): Board of Punishments (Ministry of Justice)
  as Kim Tae-jeong, Ministry of Justice's secretary, 형조참의, rank 3a

Sogyeokseo (소격서): A government office which handled the ritual aspect of Taoism of heaven, earth and stars
  as Sogyeokseo's assistant commissioner

Gamyeong (감영): Provincial Governor's Office
 Cha Geon-woo as Hwanghae-do's governor
  as Jang Seon-poong (Haeju Provincial Governor's Office's clerk)
  as Lee Jeong-gook (interpreter)

Others

 Kim Ji-eun as Myu-hyang
  as Seon-hwa
 Song Young-woong as Oh Jang-hyun, Ming's Eunuch, Joseon-born
 
 Kim Jeong-seok
 
 Yang Jae-young
 
 
 Ra Yoon-chan
 Ahn Soo-ho
 Kim Tae-beom
 Min Byung-wook
 
 
 Baek Min as Kim Moon-chang
 
  as Atayi (Jurchen tribe)
 Jang Moon-gyu
 
 Yoon Jong-goo
 
 
  as Lee Myung-woo
  as Yeo Joo-daek
 Sung Chan-ho
 Choi Gyo-sik
 Lee Yoon-sang
 
 Jung Eun-sung as Myung-seon
 
 Seo Ha-joon as Man-ok
 
 Baek Seung-cheol
 
 
 Choi Yoon-joon
 
 Song Jin-woo
 
  as bandit boss
 
 
 
 Jeon Hae-ryong
 Seol In-ah as young Court Lady Han
 Sung Hyun-mi
 Kim Mi-so as Mong-shil
 
  as Ma Chang-do
 
 
 
 Ahn Min-sang
 
 Moon Cheol-hoon
 Yoon Sung-hyun
 Kim Kwang-tae
 
 Jo Jeong-moon
 Kang Hak-soo
 Go Han-min
 Uhm Tae-ok
 Park Ik-joon
 Lee Taek-geun
 
 
 
 Yoon Hyuk-jin
 Jang Gyeok-soo

Ratings
In the table below,  represent the lowest ratings and  represent the highest ratings.

Remarks
Episode 12 wasn't aired on Sunday June 5 due to broadcast of the football friendly match between Czech Republic and South Korea. This episode was aired on Saturday June 11, 2016.
Episode 28 wasn't aired on Saturday August 6 due to broadcast of the 2016 Summer Olympics in Rio de Janeiro, Brazil. This episode was aired on Sunday August 7, 2016.
Episode 29 wasn't aired on August 13, August 14 and August 20 due to broadcast of the 2016 Summer Olympics in Rio de Janeiro, Brazil. This episode was aired on Sunday, August 21, 2016.

Original soundtrack

OST Part 1

OST Part 2

OST Part 3

Full album

Awards and nominations

References

External links
  
 The Flower in Prison at MBC Global Media
 
 
 The Flower in Prison at Daum 

2016 South Korean television series debuts
South Korean historical television series
South Korean romance television series
South Korean action television series
MBC TV television dramas
Korean-language television shows
Television shows written by Choi Wan-kyu
Television series set in the Joseon dynasty
Television series by Kim Jong-hak Production